When You Need Me may refer to:

"When You Need Me" (Aaron Hall song), 1994
"When You Need Me" (The Mullans song), representing Ireland at Eurovision 1999
"When You Need Me", a song by Bruce Springsteen from Tracks, 1998
"When You Need Me", a song by Will Downing, with Chanté Moore, 2000